Cellana testudinaria is a species of sea snail, a marine gastropod mollusk in the family Nacellidae.

Description

Distribution

References

 Nakano T. & Ozawa T. (2007). Worldwide phylogeography of limpets of the order Patellogastropoda: molecular, morphological and paleontological evidence. Journal of Molluscan Studies 73(1): 79–99.

Nacellidae
Gastropods described in 1758
Taxa named by Carl Linnaeus